Gustave Ador (23 December 1845 – 31 March 1928) was a Swiss politician. In 1919, he became President of the Confederation.

Biography

Origins
Ador was born in Cologny, a municipality of Geneva. He was the grandson of Jean Pierre Ador, an immigrant from Vaud, who obtained his Genevan citizenship in 1814. Ador studied law at the academy (now the university) of Geneva, and in 1868 became a lawyer.

Early political career

In 1871, Ador started his political career as a member of the communal council of Cologny, and was twice mayor, in 1878-9 and 1883-5. 
He was a member of the cantonal parliament 1874-6, and continuously from 1878 to 1915 save for a short break in 1902. In 1878-9 he represented Geneva in the Swiss Conseil des États. Then he became a member of the executive of the canton of Geneva, being put in charge of the Department of Justice and Police. He resigned after an unfavourable election in 1880, but once more became a member of the cantonal executive in 1885, and for 12 years had charge of the cantonal finances.

National Council
In 1889, he became a member of the Swiss Conseil National (Swiss National Council), and remained so until 1917, being elected President of the Swiss National Council in 1901. He was president of the cantonal executive in 1890, 1892, and 1896. 
In 1894, he became lieutenant-colonel in the Swiss Army. 
Ador served as the president of the International Committee of the Red Cross from 1910 to 1928. In 1914, he founded in Geneva the association for facilitating communications between prisoners of war and the central Geneva agency, and succeeded in giving this enterprise great importance and a widespread extension.

Federal Council
After the enforced resignation of Arthur Hoffmann, Ador, in order to soothe the Entente, became a federal councilor (a member of the Federal Executive) on 26 June 1917. He was entrusted with the Department of Foreign Affairs. Towards the end of 1918, he was elected by Parliament to be the Swiss President for 1919, but retired from the Federal Executive at the end of his year of office, on 31 December 1919. 
During his time as councilor, along with being in the Department of Foreign Affairs (1917), he was later in the Department of Home Affairs (1918 - 1919). He was affiliated with the Liberal Party.

Notes

References

External links 

Fondation Gustave Ador 

 

1845 births
1928 deaths
People from the canton of Geneva
Swiss Calvinist and Reformed Christians
Liberal Party of Switzerland politicians
Foreign ministers of Switzerland
Members of the Federal Council (Switzerland)
Members of the Council of States (Switzerland)
Members of the National Council (Switzerland)
Presidents of the National Council (Switzerland)
Swiss military officers
University of Geneva alumni
19th-century Swiss military personnel